Christensenella hongkongensis is a species of clinically relevant gram-positive coccobacilli, first isolated from patients in Hong Kong and Canada in 2006. Although the species remains relatively rare, it has a high mortality rate of up to 50%. Christensenella is thought to be broadly distributed globally, as it has been isolated from patient blood cultures around the world including Hong Kong, South Korea, New Zealand, Canada, Sweden, France and Italy. Fewer than 15 cases of C. hongkongensis have been observed worldwide.

Phenotypic characteristics 
C. hongkongensis grow on sheep blood agar as nonhemolytic pinpoint colonies after 48 h of incubation at 37 °C in an anaerobic environment. All are catalase positive and motile, with flagella. They produce acid from arabinose, glucose and xylose. They do not produce indole or reduce nitrate.

Clinical features and diagnosis 
Symptoms of C. hongkongensis infection include fever, vomiting, abdominal distension and constipation. The bacteria have been present in cases of bacteraemia. To accurately identify C. hongkongensis, 16S rRNA sequencing is recommended. Other identification methods such as MALDI-TOF, have not been able to identify the bacteria correctly.

Treatment 
Antibiotic treatment is usually administered upon C. hongkongensis infection. C. hongkongensis has been shown to be susceptible to antibiotics including kanamycin, vancomycin, cefuroxime, ciprofloxacin and metronidazole. In one case, the patient recovered without any antibiotic treatment.

References

Gram-positive bacteria
Species described in 2006